Douglas West was a House of Keys constituency in Douglas, Isle of Man.  It elected 2 MHKs.

MHKs & elections

External links
Constituency maps and general election results

Constituencies of the Isle of Man